Darius Vinnett (born September 30, 1984) from St. Rose, Louisiana is a former American football cornerback. He was signed by the St. Louis Rams as an undrafted free agent in 2007. He played college football at Arkansas and high school football at Destrehan High School.

Vinnett was also a member of the Atlanta Falcons, Florida Tuskers and Virginia Destroyers.

External links
Just Sports Stats
Arkansas Razorbacks bio

1984 births
Living people
People from St. Rose, Louisiana
Players of American football from New Orleans
American football cornerbacks
Destrehan High School alumni
West Hills Falcons football players
Arkansas Razorbacks football players
St. Louis Rams players
Atlanta Falcons players
Florida Tuskers players
Virginia Destroyers players